Microtis angusii, commonly known as the Mona Vale onion orchid, and Angus's onion orchid is a species of orchid endemic to New South Wales. It has a single hollow, onion-like leaf and up to sixty small, crowded green flowers. It is only known from a single population near Ingleside where it grows in soil that may have been imported from elsewhere.

Description
Flowering occurs from May to October.

Taxonomy and naming
Microtis angusii was first formally described by David Jones in 1996 and the description was published in The Orchadian. The specific epithet (angusii) honours Reginald James Angus who discovered the species in 1987.

Distribution and habitat
The Mona Vale onion orchid grows is only known from a single disturbed site at the type location near Ingleside. The site was previously used as a soil dump and as a parking area for work vehicles. It is possible that the orchid has germinated in the imported soil.

Conservation
Microtis angusii is listed as "Endangered" under the New South Wales Biodiversity Conservation Act 2016 and under the Commonwealth Government Environment Protection and Biodiversity Conservation Act 1999 (EPBC) Act. The species is threatened mainly by weed invasion as well as by illegal rubbish dumping, grazing by rabbits and other herbivores and habitat degradation due to unrestricted access.

References

External links
 

angusii
Endemic orchids of Australia
Orchids of New South Wales
Plants described in 1996